was a feudal domain under the Tokugawa shogunate of Edo period Japan.  It is located in Shinano Province, Honshū. The domain was centered at Iwamurada Jin’ya, located in what is now part of the city of Saku in Nagano Prefecture.  It was ruled for all of its history by a junior branch of the Naitō clan.

History
In 1703, Naito Masatomo, the daimyō of Akanuma Domain in Musashi Province exchanged his scattered holdings in Musashi, Kōzuke, Hitachi, Kazusa and Shimōsa Provinces for a holding consisting of 27 villages with an assessed kokudaka of 16,000 koku in Saku District in Shinano Province. This marked the start of Iwamurada Domain, which his descendants continued to rule uninterrupted until the Meiji restoration.

The 6th daimyō, Naito Masatsuna, was a brother of Mizuno Tadakuni and served as a rōjū in the administration of the Tokugawa shogunate. During his time, the status of the domain was upgraded to that of a “castle-holding domain”, although no castle was actually built.

During the Boshin War, the domain quickly supported the imperial side, and participated in the Battle of Utsunomiya Castle and Battle of Hokuetsu and Battle of Aizu.  In July 1871, with the abolition of the han system, Iwamurada Domain briefly became Iwamurada Prefecture, and was merged into the newly created Nagano Prefecture. Under the new Meiji government, Naitō Masanobu, the last daimyō of Iwamurada Domain was given the kazoku peerage title of shishaku (viscount).

Bakumatsu period holdings
As with most domains in the han system, Iwamurada Domain consisted of several discontinuous territories calculated to provide the assigned kokudaka, based on periodic cadastral surveys and projected agricultural yields.
Shinano Province
4 villages in Chiiisagata District
20 villages in Saku District

List of daimyō

See also
List of Han

References
The content of this article was largely derived from that of the corresponding article on Japanese Wikipedia.

External links
 Iwamurada Domain on "Edo 300 HTML"

Notes

Domains of Japan
History of Nagano Prefecture
Shinano Province